Carmen M. Garcia (born 1957/1958) is the former chief judge of Trenton Municipal Court. She was inducted into the New Jersey Women's Hall of Fame in 2012.

Early life and education 
Garcia grew up in Camden and Pennsauken Township, New Jersey. Garcia received a Bachelor of Science from Saint Joseph's University. She also received her Juris Doctor from Rutgers University School of Law in Camden.

Career 
Early in her career, Garcia worked as a law clerk to United States District Judge Joseph H. Rodriguez. Garcia served as Assistant Counsel to New Jersey Governor Thomas Kean from 1987 to 1988. She served as a Municipal Judge in Trenton, New Jersey, until 2004.

In 2004, Garcia was appointed to the New Jersey state parole board as an Associate Board Member. The next year she became one of two state parole board members assigned to review matters involving juvenile offenders. In 2008, Governor Jon Corzine nominated Garcia for reappointment to the New Jersey state parole board. The state senate confirmed Garcia's nomination giving her a six-year term.

Memberships and associations 
As of 2013, Garcia served as Chief Diversity Officer of the New Jersey Women Lawyers Association. Garcia is also a Trustee to the Hispanic Bar Association of New Jersey and a member of the Capital Health Regional Hospital System Board of Directors.

Honors 
Garcia was inducted into the New Jersey Women's Hall of Fame in 2012 and the Camden Catholic High School Hall of Fame in 2015.

See also 
 List of Hispanic/Latino American jurists

References

External links 
 New Jersey Parole Board

1950s births
Living people
20th-century American women lawyers
20th-century American lawyers
21st-century American judges
American women lawyers
American lawyers
Hispanic and Latino American judges
New Jersey state court judges
People from Camden, New Jersey
People from Pennsauken Township, New Jersey
Rutgers School of Law–Camden alumni
Saint Joseph's University alumni
Women in Red 2016
Year of birth missing (living people)
21st-century American women judges